Patrick John Badger, (born July 22, 1967, in Boston, Massachusetts) is a musician, singer, and songwriter, best known as the bass guitarist in the band Extreme. 

He has also performed in groups like Daemon, In The Pink, Super Trans Atlantic, Tribe of Judah, and The Dark Desert Eagels.

Early life
Badger was born in Massachusetts to Al Badger and Lily Badger ( Aguilar). He is of Irish and Honduran descent.

Music
He sang backing vocals on both Dweezil Zappa's album Confessions and the Danger Danger album, Screw It!, along with his Extreme bandmates Gary Cherone and Nuno Bettencourt. He has also sung back-up on a live version of the Van Halen song, "When It's Love" on Sammy Hagar's live album, Live: Hallelujah, on which Cherone sang co-lead vocals with Hagar.

In 2013, Pat initiated a PledgeMusic campaign. This helped him release his first solo record, "Time Will Tell". By offering exclusive content to listeners who pledged and providing updates related to the project to his following, the  PledgeMusic campaign reached its goal and the record entitled "Time Will Tell" was released in late 2014. In 2016 he followed up with a second PledgeMusic campaign for his second solo album Take What We Want (under the name Nasty Ass Honey Badgers).

In 2017, he formed a band called Dark Desert Eagles, a tribute to the Eagles. The band features Extreme drummer Kevin Figueiredo.

References 

1967 births
Living people
American rock bass guitarists
American male bass guitarists
Extreme (band) members
People from Winchester, Massachusetts
People from West Newbury, Massachusetts
American people of Honduran descent
20th-century American bass guitarists
20th-century American male musicians
American people of Irish descent
Hispanic and Latino American musicians